2002 Emmy Awards may refer to:

 54th Primetime Emmy Awards, the 2002 Emmy Awards ceremony honoring primetime programming June 2001 – May 2002
 29th Daytime Emmy Awards, the 2002 Emmy Awards ceremony honoring daytime programming during 2001
 30th International Emmy Awards, honoring international programming

Emmy Award ceremonies by year